There are several rivers named Barra Grande River:

Brazil
 Barra Grande River (Ivaí River tributary), Paraná state
 Barra Grande River (Santa Catarina)
 Barra Grande River (Tibagi River tributary), Paraná state
 Da Barra Grande River, Rio de Janeiro state